Goedertrouw Dam is an earth-filled dam in South Africa. The Dam was constructed on the Mhlathuze River, near Eshowe, KwaZulu-Natal, in 1980 (commissioned in 1982). It currently has a capacity of 301 million m3 and is principally for provision of water to the industrial complex at Richards Bay. It serves also as reservoir for irrigation and domestic use. The hazard potential of the dam has been ranked high (3).

See also
List of reservoirs and dams in South Africa
List of rivers of South Africa

References 

 List of South African Dams from the Department of Water Affairs and Forestry (South Africa)

Dams in South Africa
Dams completed in 1982
1982 establishments in South Africa